Oxopentanoic acid may refer to:

 Levulinic acid (4-oxopentanoic acid)
 3-Oxopentanoic acid